Miguel Gastón Aguilar Egüez (born September 29, 1953) is a retired Bolivian football midfielder. Active during the 1970s and 80's, he played at the professional level in Bolivia and Argentina.

Playing career

Club
Aguilar began his career with Oriente Petrolero in 1977. Two years later he transferred to Bolívar before joining The Strongest in 1980. That same year, he also had a brief spell with Argentine club Ferro Carril Oeste. In his return to Bolivia he signed with Blooming where he played from 1981 to 1982. The following season, he made his second stint with Oriente and later with The Strongest. His last professional club was Destroyers. Aguilar retired in 1988.

International
Aguilar also played for the Bolivia national team between 1977 and 1983, scoring 10 goals in 34 games.

Managerial career
After retiring as a player, he took up coaching. The teams he managed include Blooming, Oriente Petrolero and Real Santa Cruz. He was also Ramiro Blacutt's assistant coach in 2004, when he was in charge of the national team.

References

External links
 BDFA profile 

1953 births
Living people
Sportspeople from Santa Cruz de la Sierra
Association football midfielders
Bolivian footballers
Bolivia international footballers
Oriente Petrolero players
Club Bolívar players
The Strongest players
Club Blooming players
Club Destroyers players
Ferro Carril Oeste footballers
Bolivian expatriate footballers
Expatriate footballers in Argentina
Bolivian football managers
Club Blooming managers
Oriente Petrolero managers